Anfisa Anatolyevna Reztsova (née Romanova, Романова; born 16 December 1964) is a former Soviet and Russian biathlete and cross-country skier who competed in both sports from 1985 to 2000.

Career
In Soviet times, she trained at Dynamo in Vladimir.

She earned a total of five medals in the Winter Olympics, including three golds (1988: cross country 4 × 5 km relay, 1992: biathlon 7.5 km, 1994: biathlon 4 × 7.5 km relay), one silver (1988: cross country 20 km), and one bronze (1992: biathlon 3 × 7.5 km relay). She is notable for performing the feat of being the only person to win Olympic gold medals in both cross-country skiing and biathlon. She is one of the few sportspersons to win gold at three consecutive Olympics under three different flags, the first being the Soviet union in 1988, the second – Unified Team in 1992, and the third being the Russian Federation in 1994.

Reztsova also found success at the FIS Nordic World Ski Championships, earning three golds (4 × 5 km relay: 1985, 1987, 1999) and two silvers (1987: 5 km, 20 km). She also won one cross-country World Cup and seven biathlon World Cups in her career.

She lives in Moscow. She is the mother of biathletes Daria Virolaynen and Kristina Reztsova.

In an interview with a Russian sports website in 2020, she admitted having used illegal performance-enhancing drugs at the end of her career.

During the 2022 Russian invasion of Ukraine, Norwegian biathlon athletes wanted Russian athletes to be excluded from international competitions. This made Reztsova claim that Russian athletes would always be better than the Norwegians, claim that Norwegians just wanted to get rid of competitors, and liken Norwegians with "discusting cockroaches".

Cross-country skiing results
All results are sourced from the International Ski Federation (FIS).

Olympic Games
 2 medals – (1 gold, 1 silver)

World Championships
 5 medals – (3 gold, 2 silver)

World Cup

Season standings

Individual podiums
10 podiums

Team podiums
 8 victories 
 11 podiums

Note:   Until the 1999 World Championships and the 1994 Olympics, World Championship and Olympic races were included in the World Cup scoring system.

References

  at the International Biathlon Union
 . Birth date listed as December 6, 1964.

1964 births
Living people
People from Gus-Khrustalny District
Russian female biathletes
Russian female cross-country skiers
Soviet sportspeople in doping cases
Russian sportspeople in doping cases
Soviet female biathletes
Soviet female cross-country skiers
Olympic cross-country skiers of the Soviet Union
Olympic biathletes of the Unified Team
Olympic biathletes of Russia
Cross-country skiers at the 1988 Winter Olympics
Biathletes at the 1992 Winter Olympics
Biathletes at the 1994 Winter Olympics
Olympic gold medalists for Russia
Olympic gold medalists for the Soviet Union
Olympic silver medalists for the Soviet Union
Olympic gold medalists for the Unified Team
Olympic bronze medalists for the Unified Team
Olympic medalists in biathlon
Olympic medalists in cross-country skiing
Biathlon World Championships medalists
FIS Nordic World Ski Championships medalists in cross-country skiing
Medalists at the 1988 Winter Olympics
Medalists at the 1992 Winter Olympics
Medalists at the 1994 Winter Olympics
Russian State University of Physical Education, Sport, Youth and Tourism alumni
Doping cases in biathlon
Doping cases in cross-country skiing
Sportspeople from Vladimir Oblast